The Ulaanbaatar Railbus is a rail-based public transit system in the Mongolian capital of Ulaanbaatar.

Route
The rail route has one line, and starts at the west side of the capital at the Tolgoit Station, through the city centre to the east side of the city terminating at the Amgalan Station.  There are a total of eight stations on the route.

Rolling stock
Two Metrowagonmash RA-2 railbuses are operated on the route, the first trip was on 7 June 2014.

See also
Ulaanbaatar Metro
Rail transport in Mongolia

References

Ulaanbaatar
Rapid transit in Mongolia
Public transport in Mongolia
Transport in Ulaanbaatar